Hillview is a village in Greene County, Illinois, United States. The population was 193 at the 2010 census.

Geography
Hillview is located in northwestern Greene County at  (39.449652, -90.537983), in the valley of Hurricane Creek where it enters the Illinois River bottomlands.

Demographics

As of the census of 2000, there were 179 people, 63 households, and 50 families residing in the village. The racial makeup of the village was 100.00% White.

There were 63 households, out of which 30.2% had children under the age of 18 living with them, 65.1% were married couples living together, 7.9% had a female householder with no husband present, and 20.6% were non-families. 19.0% of all households were made up of individuals, and 12.7% had someone living alone who was 65 years of age or older.  The average household size was 2.84 and the average family size was 3.24.

In the village, the population was spread out, with 28.5% under the age of 18, 5.0% from 18 to 24, 27.9% from 25 to 44, 21.8% from 45 to 64, and 16.8% who were 65 years of age or older.  The median age was 35 years. For every 100 females, there were 98.9 males.  For every 100 females age 18 and over, there were 93.9 males.

The median income for a household in the village was $24,167, and the median income for a family was $25,625. Males had a median income of $15,625 versus $18,750 for females. The per capita income for the village was $9,157.  About 23.7% of families and 25.3% of the population were below the poverty line, including 25.5% of those under the age of eighteen and 15.4% of those 65 or over.

History

(From the Illinois Valley Cultural Heritage Association website) William Shelton, a ranger from Ft. Russell, Edwardsville, chose the alcove at the mouth of Hurricane Creek (creek at Eldred also called Hurricane), in 1826, to build a cabin. He left no record except Shelton's Hill, Shelton’s Spring, and Shelton’s Graveyard. A back water lake bore the name of another early settler, Bucks Lake, for Joseph Buck, 1825. Another family name is Bishop’s Dell for James Bishop, 1830. The farm where Bishop's Dell was located is bordered on the south by Trimley creek and the barn that James Bishop constructed using wooden pegs still stands as well as the foundation of his one-room stone home built against the bluff. Seely and Hodges built a mill on the creek in 1833. W. D. Wells came from North Carolina in 1834 and planted a small apple orchard on his farm. Later the McClay Orchard became famous for its varieties of apples and methods in orchard management. When the Chicago and Alton Railroad connected with the Kansas City branch at Roodhouse, Hillview was a lumber camp called Happy Ville. This is the same on the Illinois Atlas map of Greene County, 1876. In 1893 Hapeville was replaced by with Pegram P.O. and was locally reoffered to as both Hapeville and Pegram. The village of Hillview was incorporated in 1903. It still remains the route of the Illinois Central Gulf West.

Indian history 

In the 1980s, the Kampsville Archeological Center, located in Kampsville, Illinois, dug in the sand ridge area west of Hillview. Pottery, axes, grinding stones and arrowheads are not uncommon in this area, and it was theorized that the area was a factory for arrowheads at one time, without permanent settlement.

Referencesre

Villages in Greene County, Illinois
Villages in Illinois
Populated places established in 1903
1903 establishments in Illinois